Eugene P. Smith (August 8, 1871 – March 24, 1918) was a United States Navy sailor and a recipient of the United States military's highest decoration, the Medal of Honor.

Biography
On that day, the Decatur suffered an explosion of unknown cause and four compartments, including the ship's magazine, were engulfed in flames. Despite heavy fumes of undetermined origin and the risk of further explosions, Smith and other sailors entered the compartments and rescued three gunner's mates. Smith was one of the first to enter the compartment in which the three men were trapped, and he returned "between five and eight times" while trying to locate them through the thick smoke. Finding one man, named Elkins, in the farthest corner of the chamber, Smith was partially overcome by the fumes and forced to retreat. After regaining his breath, he re-entered the compartment and saved Elkins. The commanding officer of the Decatur later stated that, of the crewmen, Smith "did most of all to save his shipmates." For these actions, he was awarded the Medal of Honor five months later, on February 8, 1916.

Smith died at age 46 and was buried at Cypress Hills National Cemetery in Brooklyn, New York.

Medal of Honor citation
Smith's official Medal of Honor citation reads:
Attached to U.S.S. Decatur; for several times entering compartments on board of Decatur immediately following an explosion on board that vessel, 9 September 1915, and locating and rescuing injured shipmates.

See also

List of Medal of Honor recipients

References

External links

1871 births
1918 deaths
United States Navy sailors
United States Navy Medal of Honor recipients
People from Illinois
Non-combat recipients of the Medal of Honor